Matilda, also spelled Mathilda and Mathilde, is the English form of the Germanic female name Mahthildis, which derives from the Old High German "maht" (meaning "might and strength") and "hild" (meaning "battle").

Mathilde appeared among the top 10 most popular names for girls born in Denmark in 2008 and the name was also well-used in Norway, Sweden and Finland. It is also currently rising in popularity in other European countries, including in France, the United Kingdom and in other English-speaking countries.

The name was most popular in the United States between 1880 and 1910, when it was among the top 200 names given to girls. It left the top 1,000 names in the United States by 1964 but reappeared for the first time in 44 years in the top 1,000 names as the 869th most popular name for baby girls born in 2008 in the United States.

Translations
Mahthildis (Ancient Germanic)
Matylda, Tylda (Czech)
Mathilde, Tilde, Tille (Danish)
Mathilde, Machteld, Mechteld (Dutch)
Mathilda, Matilda, Matti, Mattie, Matty, Maud, Maude, Maudie, Tilda, Tilli, Tillie, Tilly (English)
Mathilde, Mahault, Mahaud, Mahaut, Maheut (French)
Mathilde, Mechthild, Mechthildis, Mechtild, Mechtilde, Hilde, Tilde (German)
Mathilde (Μαθίλδη) (Greek)
Matilda (מטילדה) (Hebrew)
Matild (Hungarian)
Matthildur (Icelandic)
Mafalda, Matelda, Matélda, Matilde (Italian)
Machiruda (Japanese)
Matilda, Mathilda, Mathildis (Latin)
Mǣþhild (Old English)
Matylda (Polish)
Matilde (Portuguese)
Matilde, Matilda (Spanish)
Matilda (Матильда) (Russian)

Saints 

 Matilda of Ringelheim (968)
 Mechthild of Sponheim, Bad Kreuznach (1154)
 Mechtildis of Edelstetten, Dießen, Andechs (1160)
 Mechtilde of Lappion in Picardy (1200)
 Mechthild of Magdeburg (1282/1294)
 Mechtilde of Hackeborn (1298)

People
Empress Matilda or Empress Maud (1102–1167), Lady of the English, Queen of Germany, daughter of Henry I of England, mother of Henry II of England
Matilda, Countess of Angus (fl. 13th century), Scottish noblewoman
Matilda, Countess of Rethel (1091–1151), French noblewoman
Mathilda Berwald (1798–1877) Swedish royal court singer
Matilda Carse (1835–1917), Irish-born American businesswoman, social reformer, publisher
Matilda Maranda Crawford (1844–1920), American-Canadian newspaper correspondent, writer, poet
Mathilda d'Orozco (1796–1863), composer
Mathilda Enequist (1833–1898), Swedish opera singer
Mathilda Foy (1813–1869), Swedish philanthropist
Mathilda Gelhaar (1813–1889), opera singer
Mathilda Linsén (1831-1872), Finnish educator
Mathilda May (born 1965), French film actress
Matilda of England, Duchess of Saxony (1156–1189), Duchess of Saxony, daughter of Henry II of England
Matilda of Holstein (1220 or 1225–1288), Danish queen consort
Matilda of Savoy (1390–1498), Electress palatine
Mathilda Rotkirch (1813–1842), Finnish painter

Matilde Camus (1919–2012), Spanish poet
Matilda Coxe Stevenson (1855–1915, née Evans), American ethnologist and author
Matilda Cugler-Poni (1851–1931), Romanian poet
Matilda Etches (1898-1974), British fashion designer
Matilda Ehringhaus (1890–1980), First Lady of North Carolina
Matilda Lowther (b. 1995), British fashion model
Matilda Jane Sager (1839–1928), fifth of the Sager orphans
Matilda Joslyn Gage (1826–1898), 19th century American feminist and freethinker

Matilda of Boulogne (1104–1152), Queen of England, wife of Stephen of England
Matilda of Flanders (c. 1031–1083), Queen of England, wife of William I of England
Matilda of Habsburg (1253–1304), Duchess consort of Bavaria
Matilda of Ringelheim, (892–968), wife of Henry the Fowler, King of East Francia
Matilda of Savoy, Queen of Portugal (1125–1158), First Portuguese queen-consort
Matilda of Scotland (c. 1080–1118), originally named Edith, wife of Henry I of England
Matilda of Tuscany (1046–1114), Countess of Tuscany (also called Mathilde or Matilde of Canossa)
Matilda of Vianden, Lady of Požega (-after 1255), wife of John Angelos of Syrmia
Mechtilde of Hackeborn, 1240/41-1298, Saxon Christian saint and nun
Mechtilde Lichnowsky (1879–1958), German writer born Mechtilde Christiane Marie Gräfin von und zu Arco-Zinneberg
Mechtildis of Edelstetten or Mechtildis of Edelstetten (died 1160)
Mechthild of Magdeburg (c. 1207 – c. 1282/1294), Beguine and mystic
Mechtild of Nassau (before 1280 – 19 June 1323), Duchess consort of Bavaria
Mechtilde of the Blessed Sacrament (1614–1698), French nun and founder of order
Mechtild Rothe (born 1947), German politician

Queen Mathilde of Belgium (born 1973), wife of King Philippe of the Belgians

Tilda Swinton (born 1960), British actress, model and artist
Tilda Thamar (1921–1989), Argentine actress
Matilda Dawson (born 2000), New Zealand footballer
Matthildur Grétarsdóttir (born 2008), Icelandic Taylor Swift and Marvel enthusiast
Mechtild Ramay (born 2010), African food taster
Matilda Rose Ledger (born 2005), daughter of late actor Heath Ledger and actress Michelle Williams.

Fictional characters
 Matilda Wormwood, a main character in Roald Dahl's novel Matilda
 Matilda de Villanegas, a fictional character in Matthew Lewis' The Monk.
 Matilda, a fictional character from the anime/manga Strike Witches
 Mathilda, a fictional character at the end of Purgatorio of Dante's Divine Comedy.
 Mathilda McCann, a fictional character played by Alana Austin in the Steve Martin movie A Simple Twist of Fate.
 Matilda McDuck, a Disney character who is Scrooge McDuck's sister and Donald Duck's maternal aunt
Matilda "Mattie" Hunter, a fictional character from the popular Australian soap opera Home and Away, played by Indiana Evans.
 Matilda, Cranky Doodle Donkey’s love interest in My Little Pony: Friendship Is Magic
 A fictional character in the Gothic novel The Castle of Otranto, daughter of Manfred.
 Matilda Ajan.
 A fictional character representing Protestantism in Heinrich Heine's "The City of Lucca" and "The Baths of Lucca".
 Mathilda Lando (played by Natalie Portman), Leon's apprentice and companion in Luc Besson's Léon.
 Tilly, French-speaking character in the pre-school children's TV show Tots TV.
Matilda Ashby, character on the America soap opera The Young and the Restless
Matilda Román, main antagonist (later friends with Grachi) from the Latin American TV series Grachi. Played by Kimberly Dos Ramos.
 Matilda "Matty" Jenkyns, a charakter from Elizabeth Gaskells novel Cranford who was portrayed by Judi Dench in the TV-Series of the same title.
Matilda, the hen in the Angry Birds franchise.
Mathilde, a love interest and Emil's sister in the popular Danish TV series BaseBoys.
Matilda Bradbury, the real name of Laudna in the third campaign of the popular DND live-show Critical Role.

Music
"Waltzing Matilda", Australian folk song.
"Matilda" is a song by alt-J (∆).
"Matilda Mother" is a song by Pink Floyd
Mathilda - a calypso composed by Norman Span (King Radio), which in 1953 become famous worldwide from the version by Harry Belafonte.
"Matilda" is a song by Harry Styles which appears on his album Harry's House.

Film
Matilda's Legacy, an Australian film starring American actor Oliver Hardy
Matilda (1996 film), an American film based on the novel by British author Roald Dahl
''Matilda (1978 film)

See also

References

English feminine given names
Italian feminine given names